is a Japanese athlete. She competed in the mixed 4 × 400 metres relay event at the 2019 World Athletics Championships.

References

External links

2002 births
Living people
Japanese female sprinters
Place of birth missing (living people)
World Athletics Championships athletes for Japan